The Universidad Pontificia de México (Pontifical University of Mexico) is a private institution of higher education established by the Holy See and sponsored by the Roman Catholic Episcopate in Mexico. It is one of the two modern Mexican universities claiming to be successors of the Royal and Pontifical University of Mexico (Real y Pontificia Universidad de México) one of the first universities founded in North America.

See also
Pontifical university
Royal and Pontifical University of Mexico

References

External links
Official website

Universities in Mexico City
Mexico
Catholic universities and colleges in Mexico
Educational institutions established in 1982
1982 establishments in Mexico